Events from the year 1972 in Kuwait.

Incumbents
Emir: Sabah Al-Salim Al-Sabah
Prime Minister: Jaber Al-Ahmad Al-Sabah

Events

Births

 Anas Khalid Al Saleh
 24 January - Saqer Al-Surayei.
 1 July - Samer Al Marta.

See also
Years in Jordan
Years in Syria

References

 
Kuwait
Kuwait
Years of the 20th century in Kuwait
1970s in Kuwait